Elias Fälth (born March 30, 1981) is a Swedish professional ice hockey defenceman, currently playing for Tappara Tampere in the Finnish Liiga.

Playing career 
Fälth saw his first minutes in Sweden’s second division Allsvenskan with Huddinge IK during the 1999-2000 season. Until 2010, he played for five other Allsvenskan sides, including the Halmstad Hammers, Nybro Vikings, Borås HC, VIK Västerås HK and Almtuna IS.

He signed with Luleå HF of the Swedish elite-league SHL in 2010, where he spent two years, before transferring to HV71 in 2012. In 2014, Fälth moved on to Frölunda HC. In his second year with Frölunda, he helped the team win the Swedish championship and the Champions Hockey League title.

He did not have his contract renewed by Frölunda following the 2015–16 campaign and then signed with fellow SHL outfit Brynäs IF in May 2016.

International play 
Fälth made his debut with the Swedish national team in November 2010 and was a member of the gold-winning Swedish squad at the 2013 World Championship. He made 10 appearances during the tournament, scoring one goal.

Career statistics

Regular season and playoffs

International

Awards and honors

References

External links 

1981 births
Almtuna IS players
Borås HC players
Brynäs IF players
Frölunda HC players
Huddinge IK players
HV71 players
Living people
Luleå HF players
Swedish ice hockey defencemen
VIK Västerås HK players